The 1997–98 George Washington Colonials men's basketball team represent George Washington University as a member of the Atlantic 10 Conference during the 1997–98 NCAA Division I men's basketball season. The team was coached by Mike Jarvis and played their home games at the Charles E. Smith Athletic Center. The Colonials finished in a three-way tie for third place in the regular season conference standings. After being knocked out in the semifinal round of the A-10 tournament, GW received an at-large bid to the 1998 NCAA tournament as No. 9 seed in the Southeast region. The Colonials were defeated by No. 8 seed Oklahoma, 75–63, to finish with a record of 24–9 (11–5 A-10).

Roster

Schedule and results

|-
!colspan=9 style=| Regular season

|-
!colspan=9 style=| Atlantic 10 Tournament

|-
!colspan=9 style=| NCAA Tournament

Rankings

References

George Washington
George Washington Colonials men's basketball seasons
George Washington